Wilmot may refer to:

Places

Australia
Division of Wilmot, an abolished Australian Electoral Division in Tasmania
Wilmot, Tasmania, a locality in the North-West Region

Canada
Wilmot, Nova Scotia, an unincorporated rural community and former township
Wilmot, Ontario, a township
Wilmot, Prince Edward Island, a neighbourhood of Summerside
Wilmot Islands, Nunavut
Wilmot Parish, New Brunswick

New Zealand
Wilmot Pass, a mountain pass
Wilmot River
Lake Wilmot, the mouth of the Wilmot River

United States
Wilmot, Arkansas, a city
Wilmot, Indiana, an unincorporated community
Wilmot, Kansas, an unincorporated community
 Wilmot, an unincorporated community in Kingston Township, Michigan
Wilmot, New Hampshire, a town
Wilmot, North Carolina, an unincorporated community
Wilmot, Ohio, a village
Wilmot, South Dakota, a city
Wilmot, Virginia, an unincorporated community
Wilmot, Wisconsin, a census-designated place and unincorporated community

Other places
Wilmot Township (disambiguation)

People
Wilmot (surname)
Wilmot (given name)
Baron Wilmot of Selmeston

Titles
Viscount Wilmot, a title held by two men in the 16th and 17th centuries
Baron Wilmot, a title held by Henry Wilmot, 1st Earl of Rochester, in the 17th century
Wilmot baronets, three titles, one still extant

Other uses 
Wilmott (magazine)
Wilmot (TV series), a children's sitcom
, a 1918 United States Navy patrol vessel

See also
 
Wilmots, a surname
Willmot, New South Wales, Australia, a suburb of Sydney
Willmott, a surname
Wilmotte, a surname